Saint Petersburg State University (SPBU) is a public research university in Saint Petersburg, Russia. Founded in 1724 by a decree of Peter the Great, the university from the beginning has had a focus on fundamental research in science, engineering and humanities.

During the Soviet period, it was known as Leningrad State University. It was renamed after Andrei Zhdanov in 1948 and was officially called "Leningrad State University, named after A. A. Zhdanov and decorated with the Order of Lenin and the Order of the Red Banner of Labour." Zhdanov's was removed in 1989 and Leningrad in the name was officially replaced with Saint Petersburg in 1992.

It is made up of 24 specialized faculties (departments) and institutes, the Academic Gymnasium, the Medical College, the College of Physical Culture and Sports, Economics and Technology. The university has two primary campuses: one on Vasilievsky Island and the other one in Peterhof.

International rankings

In international rankings, the university was ranked 35th by The Three University Missions Ranking in 2022, 242th by the QS World University Rankings in 2022, 607th by U.S. News & World Report in 2021, 601-800th by the Times Higher Education World University Rankings, and 301–400th by the Academic Ranking of World Universities in 2021.

History

1724–1821

It is disputed by the university administration whether Saint Petersburg State University or Moscow State University is the oldest higher education institution in Russia. While the latter was established in 1755, the former, which has been in continuous operation since 1819, claims to be the successor of the university established along with the Academic Gymnasium and the Saint Petersburg Academy of Sciences on 24 January 1724, by a decree of Peter the Great.

Between 1804 and 1819, Saint Petersburg University officially did not exist; the institution founded by Peter the Great, the Saint Petersburg Academy, had been disbanded, because the new 1803 charter of the Academy of Sciences stipulated that there should not be any educational institutions affiliated with it.

The Petersburg Pedagogical Institute, renamed the Main Pedagogical Institute in 1814, was established in 1804 and occupied a part of the Twelve Collegia building. On 8 February 1819 (O.S.), Alexander I of Russia reorganized the Main Pedagogical Institute into Saint Petersburg University, which at that time consisted of three faculties: Faculty of Philosophy and Law, Faculty of History and Philology and Faculty of Physics and Mathematics. The Main Pedagogical Institute (where Dmitri Mendeleev studied) was restored in 1828 as an educational institution independent of Saint Petersburg University, and trained teachers until it was finally closed in 1859.

1821–1917

In 1821, the university was renamed Saint Petersburg Imperial University. In 1823, most of the university moved from the Twelve Collegia to the southern part of the city. In 1824, a modified version of the charter of Moscow University was adopted as the first charter of the Saint Petersburg Imperial University. In 1829, there were 19 full professors and 169 full-time and part-time students at the university. In 1830, Tsar Nicholas returned the entire building of the Twelve Collegia to the university, and courses resumed there.

In 1835, a new Charter of the Imperial Universities of Russia was approved. It provided for the establishment of the Faculty of Law, the Faculty of History and Philology, and the Faculties of Physics and Mathematics, which were merged into the Faculty of Philosophy as the 1st and 2nd Departments, respectively.

In 1849, after the Spring of Nations, the Senate of the Russian Empire decreed the Rector should be appointed by the Minister of National Enlightenment rather than elected by the Assembly of the university. However, Pyotr Pletnyov was reappointed Rector and ultimately became the longest-serving rector of Saint Petersburg University (1840–61).

In 1855, Oriental studies were separated from the Faculty of History and Philology, and the fourth faculty, Faculty of Oriental Languages, was formally inaugurated on 27 August 1855.

In 1859–61, female part-time students could attend lectures in the university. In 1861, there were 1,270 full-time and 167 part-time students in the university, of them 498 were in the Faculty of Law, the largest subdivision. But this subdivision had the cameral studies department, where students learnt safety, occupational health and environmental engineering management and science, including chemistry, biology, agronomy along with law and philosophy. Many Russian, Georgian etc. managers, engineers and scientists studied at the Faculty of law therefore. During 1861–62, there was student unrest in the university, and it was temporarily closed twice during the year. The students were denied freedom of assembly and placed under police surveillance, and public lectures were forbidden. Many students were expelled. After the unrest, in 1865 only 524 students remained.

A decree of the Emperor Alexander II of Russia adopted on 18 February 1863, restored the right of the university assembly to elect the rector. It also formed the new faculty of the theory and history of art as part of the faculty of history and philology.

In March 1869, student unrest shook the university again, but on a smaller scale. By 1869, 2,588 students had graduated from the university.

In 1880, the Ministry of National Enlightenment forbade students to marry and married persons could not be admitted. In 1882, another student unrest took place in the university. In 1884, a new Charter of the Imperial Russian Universities was adopted, which granted the right to appoint the rector to the Minister of National Enlightenment again. On 1 March 1887 (O.S.), a group of the university students was arrested while planning an attempt on the life of Alexander III of Russia. As a result, new admission rules to gymnasiums and universities were approved by the Minister of National Enlightenment Ivan Delyanov in 1887, which barred persons of non-noble origin from admission to the university, unless they were extraordinarily talented.

By 1894, 9,212 students had graduated from the university. Among the scholars of the second half of the 19th century, affiliated with the university were mathematician Pafnuty Chebyshev, physicist Heinrich Lenz, chemists Dmitri Mendeleev and Aleksandr Butlerov, embryologist Alexander Kovalevsky, physiologist Ivan Sechenov and pedologist Vasily Dokuchaev. On 24 March 1896 (O.S.), on the campus of the university, Alexander Popov publicly demonstrated transmission of radio waves for the first time in history.

As of 1 January 1900 (O.S.), there were 2,099 students enrolled in the Faculty of Law, 1,149 students in the Faculty of Physics and Mathematics, 212 students in the Faculty of Oriental Languages and 171 students in the Faculty of History and Philology. In 1902, the first student dining hall in Russia was opened in the university.

Since about 1897, regular strikes and student unrest shook the university and spread to other institutions of higher education across Russia. During the Revolution of 1905, the charter of the Russian universities was amended once more; the autonomy of the universities was partially restored and the right to elect the rector was returned to the academic board for the first time since 1884. In 1905–06, the university was temporarily closed due to student unrest. Its autonomy was revoked again in 1911. In the same year, the university was once again temporarily closed.

In 1914, with the start of the First World War, the university was renamed Petrograd Imperial University after its namesake city. During the War, the university was the center of mobilization of Russian intellectual resources and scholarship for the victory. In 1915, a branch of the university was opened in Perm, which later became Perm State University.

1918–39
The Assembly of Petrograd Imperial University openly welcomed the February Revolution of 1917, which put an end to the Russian monarchy, and the university came to be known as Petrograd University. However, after the October Revolution of 1917, the university's staff and administration were initially vocally opposed to the Bolshevik takeover of power and reluctant to cooperate with the Narkompros. Later in 1917–22, during the Russian Civil War, some of the staff suspected of counter-revolutionary sympathies suffered imprisonment (e.g., Lev Shcherba in 1919), execution, or exile abroad on the so-called Philosophers' ships in 1922 (e.g., Nikolai Lossky). Furthermore, the entire staff suffered from hunger and extreme poverty during those years.

In 1918, the university was renamed 1st Petrograd State University, and in 1919 the Narkompros merged it with the 2nd PSU (former Psychoneurological Institute) and 3rd PSU (former Bestuzhev Higher Courses for Women) into Petrograd State University. In 1919, the Faculty of Social Science was established by the Narkompros instead of the Faculty of History and Philology, Faculty of Oriental Languages and Faculty of Law. Nicholas Marr became the first Dean of the new faculty. Chemist Alexey Favorsky became the Dean of the Faculty of Physics and Mathematics. Rabfaks and free university courses were opened on the basis of the university to provide mass education.

In the fall of 1920, as observed by freshman student Alice Rosenbaum (Ayn Rand), enrollment was open and the majority of the students were anti-communist including, until removed, a few vocal opponents of the regime. Seeing they were educating "class enemies", a purge was conducted in 1922 based on the class background of the students, and all students, other than seniors, with a bourgeois background were expelled.

In 1924, the university was renamed Leningrad State University after its namesake city. In order to suppress intellectual opposition to Soviet power, a number of historians working in the university, including Sergey Platonov, Yevgeny Tarle, and Boris Grekov, were imprisoned in the so-called Academic Affair of 1929–30 on fabricated charges of participating in a counter-revolutionary conspiracy aimed at overthrowing the government. Some other members of the staff were repressed in 1937–38 during the Great Purge.

1940–99
During the 1941–44 Siege of Leningrad in World War II, many students and staff died from starvation, in battles, or from repressions. The university evacuated to Saratov in 1942–44. A branch of the university was in Yelabuga during the war. In 1944, the Presidium of the Supreme Council of the Soviet Union awarded the university the Order of Lenin. In 1948, the Soviet Council of Ministers named the university after Andrei Zhdanov, a deceased Communist official. This decision was revoked in 1989 during Perestroika.

In 1949–50, several professors died in prison during the investigation of the Leningrad Affair fabricated by the central Soviet leadership, and the Minister of Education of the RSFSR, former rector Alexander Voznesensky, was executed.

In 1966, the Council of Ministers decided to build a suburban campus in Petrodvorets for most of the mathematics and natural science faculties. The relocation of the faculties was completed by the 1990s. In 1969, the Presidium of the Supreme Council of the Soviet Union awarded the university the Order of the Red Banner of Labour. In 1991, the university was renamed back to Saint Petersburg State University after its namesake city. The university educated Russian presidents Vladimir Putin and Dimitry Medvedev, both of whom studied law at the university.

2000-present
In early 2022, the university expelled 13 students who had protested against the 2022 Russian invasion of Ukraine.

In response to the Russian invasion, in March 2022 the Hamburg University of Applied Sciences and University of Bremen suspended their longstanding relationships with the university, Dartmouth College stopped running its Russian language study abroad program in the university, and CEMS - The Global Alliance in Management Education suspended its partnership with the Graduate School of Management in St Petersburg. In addition, the European Coimbra Group expelled the university, and the European University Association suspended the school. The Council on International Educational Exchange stopped its programs at the university, and relocated students to other non-Russian universities.

Organization

Governance

The university is a federal state institution of higher education managed by the government of the Russian Federation. It has 24 faculties and institutes which are further subdivided into departments, and other main structural subdivisions.

The superior body of self-government of the university is its Assembly, which elects the rector and the Academic Board of the university for a five-year term. The Assembly consists of the members of the Academic Board of the university and the staff delegated by the general assemblies of the main structural subdivisions according to quotas set by the Academic Board of the university. The general administration of the university is vested in the Academic Board, which consists of the rector, who presides over it, as well as the president of the university, vice rectors and representatives of the main structural subdivisions.

Likewise, the general administration of a faculty is vested in its respective academic board elected by the faculty assembly for five years. The procedure of election and department quotas are decided by the faculty-level academic board itself. The dean, who leads the faculty and presides over its academic board, is elected for five years by the faculty academic board.

Academic year
The academic year in St. Petersburg State University according to the Routine Regulations normally starts on 1 September. One lesson normally lasts an hour and a half (two academic hours). The academic year is divided into two semesters. The first semester (term) ends by late December, the second starts in mid-February and lasts until late May. Each term is followed by a series of preliminary tests (in the last week of December/May) and exams (in January/June).

Campuses

The university has two main campuses: on Vasilievsky Island in the historic city center and in Peterhof (formerly Petrodvorets), a southwestern suburb, which can be reached by railway from the city's Baltiysky Rail Terminal. The main building of the university, Twelve Collegia, is on Vasilievsky Island and includes the Library, the Faculty of Biology and the Institute of Earth Sciences. The Faculty of Philology and the Faculty of Oriental Studies share the nearby 18th-century Petrine Baroque building on Universitetskaya Embankment of the Bolshaya Neva, designed by Domenico Trezzini and originally built as the Palace of Peter II of Russia. The New Gostiny Dvor designed by Giacomo Quarenghi and built in the 19th century in that part of the island is occupied by the Institute of History, Institute of Philosophy. The Faculty of Psychology is in front of it on Admiral Makarov Embankment of the Malaya Neva. The Graduate School of Management, School of Journalism and Mass Communications, Faculty of Medicine, Faculty of Dentistry and Medical Technologies, Faculty of Law and Faculty of Military Studies are on Vasilievsky Island, but farther to the west. Four other social science faculties are east of the city center on the southern bank of the Neva: the Faculty of Economics is not far from the Chernyshevskaya metro station, while the Faculty of Sociology, Faculty of Political Science and the School of International Relations occupy historical buildings of Smolny Convent.

The new suburban campus consists of the Faculty of Applied Mathematics and Control Processes, Institute of Chemistry, Faculty of Mathematics and Mechanics, and Faculty of Physics, which are in modern buildings in Peterhof. Nearby the Peterhof campus there is a park area called Sergievka. In the Sergievka park there are buildings of the Faculty of Biology.

Faculties and Institutes
SPbSU is made up of 24 specialized faculties, which are:

 Faculty of Applied Mathematics and Control Processes (*rus | *eng)
 Faculty of Biology (*rus)
 Institute of Chemistry
 Faculty of Dentistry and Medical Technology (*rus)
 Faculty of Economics (*rus)
 Institute of Earth Sciences (*rus)
 Institute of History (*rus)
 School of International Relations (*rus)
 Faculty of Law
 Faculty of Liberal Arts and Sciences (*rus | *eng)
 Faculty of Mathematics and Mechanics (*rus | *eng)
 Faculty of Medicine (*rus)
 Faculty of Oriental Studies (*rus | *eng)
 Faculty of Arts (*rus | *eng)
 Faculty of Philology (*rus | *eng)
 Institute of Philosophy (*rus | *eng)
 Faculty of Physics (*rus | *eng)
 Faculty of Political Science (*rus) (*rus | *eng)
 Faculty of Psychology (*rus | *eng)
 Faculty of Sociology (*rus)
 Graduate School of Management
 Military Faculty (*rus)
 School of Journalism and Mass Communications (*rus | *eng)
 Faculty of Applied Communications
 Faculty of Journalism

There is also a Department of Physical Culture and Sports. (*rus)

Notable alumni and faculty 

Russian revolutionary and founder of the Soviet Union, Vladimir Lenin, was an alumnus. Russian Prime Ministers Pyotr Stolypin and Dimitry Medvedev, the incumbent president and former prime minister of Russia Vladimir Putin, and the past president of Lithuania Dalia Grybauskaitė are alumni.

Eight graduates of the university are Nobel Prize recipients: Ivan Pavlov (Physiology and Medicine, 1904), Ilya Mechnikov (Physiology and Medicine, 1908), Nikolay Semyonov (Chemistry, 1956), Lev Landau (Physics, 1962), Aleksandr Prokhorov (Physics, 1964), Wassily Leontief (Economics, 1973), Leonid Kantorovich (Economics, 1975), and Joseph Brodsky (Literature, 1987). Graduates Grigori Perelman and Stanislav Smirnov were awarded the Fields Medal.

Among the scholars affiliated with St-Petersburg State University have been Leonard Euler, Mikhail Lomonosov, chemist Dmitri Mendeleev, and mathematicians Mikhail Ostrogradsky, Abram Besicovitch, Lev M. Bregman, Pafnuty Chebyshev, Yakov Eliashberg, Leonid Frankfurt, Israel Gohberg, Yuri Linnik, Aleksandr Lyapunov, Andrey Markov, Solomon Mikhlin, Vladimir Rokhlin, Vladimir Smirnov,Sergei Sobolev, Vladimir Steklov, Victor Zalgaller, and Aleksandr Aleksandrov. In addition, physicists Boris Rosing, Vladimir Fock, Leonid Frankfurt, Lev Pavlovich Rapoport, Elena Besley, astrophysicist Viktor Ambartsumian, botanists Vladimir Komarov and Vladimir Sukachev, physiologists Ivan Sechenov, Kliment Timiryazev, philosopher and sociologist Pitirim Sorokin, historians Mahapandit Rahul Sankrityayan, Yevgeny Tarle, Gregory Areshian, and Boris Grekov, philologists Ivan Turgenev, Ilia Chavchavadze, Alexander Blok, Lev Shcherba, Vladimir Propp, Viktor Zhirmunsky, orientalists Vasily Struve, Joseph Orbeli, Boris Piotrovsky, artists Nicholas Roerich, and Zare Yusupova. Composer Igor Stravinsky attended the university from 1901 to 1905.

The American novelist Ayn Rand attended the university from 1920 to 1924, graduating with honors in history. Ukrainian nationalist and publicist Dmytro Dontsov studied law at the university for some time after 1900.

Alexander Alekhine was the fourth World Chess Champion, Gennadiy Shatkov was an Olympic champion in boxing, and Eduard Vinokurov was an Olympic and world champion sabre fencer. Joseph Shor, a student of the School of Mathematics and Mechanics, is known as the main protege of Ostap Bender. Igor Artimovich is known for creating Festi. Yakov Rekhter is known for creating BGP. Pavel Durov graduated the department of philology while his brother Nikolai Durov received his PhD from the department of mathematics. Kyrgyz sociologist Rakhat Achylova received her DPhil in 1988.

Rectors

1819–1821 Mikhail Balugyansky
1821–1825 Yevdokim Zyablovskiy
1825–1836 Antoine Jeudy Dugour
1836–1840 Ivan Shulgin
1840–1861 Pyotr Pletnyov
1861–1863 Aleksandr Voskresensky
1863–1865 Heinrich Lenz
1865–1867 Aleksandr Voskresensky
1867–1873 Karl Kessler
1873–1876 Pyotr Redkin
1876–1883 Andrei Beketov
1883 (1884)–1887 Ivan Andreevsky
1887–1890 Mikhail Vladislavlev
1890–1897 Pyotr Nikitin
1897–1899 V. Sergeevich
1899–1903 Adolf Holmsten
1903–1905 A. Zhdanov
1905–1910 Ivan Borgman
1910–1911 David Grimm
1911–1918 Erwin Grimm
1918–1919 Alexander Ivanov
1919 Sergei Zhebelev
1919–1922 Vladimir Shimkevich
1922–1926 Nikolay Derzhavin
1926–1927 V. Tomashevsky
1927–1930 Mikhail Serebryakov
1930–1932 Yury Nikich (director)
1932–1933 V. Seryozhnikov (director)
1933–1938 Mikhail Lazurkin (director)
1938–1939 Konstantin Lukashev (director)
1939 A. Marchenko (director)
1939–1941 P. Zolotukhin (director)
1941–1948 Alexander Voznesensky
1948–1950 Nikita Domnin
1950–1952 Alexey Ilyushin
1952–1964 Aleksandr Aleksandrov
1964–1970 Kirill Y. Kondratyev
1970–1975 Gleb Makarov
1975–1986 Valentin Aleskovsky
1986–1993 Stanislav Merkuriev
1993(1994)–2008 Lyudmila Verbitskaya
since 2008 Nikolai Kropachev

See also
 Education in Russia
 List of universities in Russia
 Open access in Russia
 Smolny College
 List of early modern universities in Europe

References

Bibliography 
  - The history of the university, with a particular focus on the Law Faculty, from the 19th century to the perestroika period

External links

 Saint Petersburg State University homepage
 History of St Petersburg University

 
1724 establishments in the Russian Empire
1819 establishments in the Russian Empire
Educational institutions established in 1819
Universities and colleges in the Soviet Union